Dashtak is a village in the Dorudzan District, Marvdasht County, Fars Province, Iran. At the 2006 census, its population was 2,109, in 542 families.

History 
Dashtak is a mountain gorge, in the north plains of Dashtak. The village is 2040 meters height above sea level and the climate is temperate in the spring and summer and in the fall and winter it is cold. Remnants from the Achaemenid period of Dashtak remained in the village and on the formation of the village in the old cemetery inscription DASHTAK, related to the seventh century AD.

People 
Dashtak villagers speak Persian in a Dashtaki accent; they are Muslims, followers of the Shia Jafari. The main agricultural activities of the Dashtak villagers are horticulture and animal husbandry. Other main activities are handicraft production, including shoemaker embroidery, and carpet weaving. Among the village products are walnuts, grapes, pomegranates, almonds; also, there are meat, dairy products and wool from the village livestock products. Beekeeping and honey production, both by new and traditional methods are common.

Topography 
Dashtak village is located in the mountain range and follows its physical context, according to the slope of the seating (the stepped shaped). The rural road network is the communication artery, with its irregular pattern based on people's needs and limitations of topography. Most of the roads are winding, narrow roads are rare. Old houses in the village are built of stones and mud bricks, and have stairs. The overall appearance is of a beautiful village. Dashtak is a mountain village with a temperate climate, which has a forest cover, extensive gardens, abundant spring Saran, beautiful waterfalls and landscapes. The village offers a hospitable heart, especially in spring and summer and provides awesome space for the viewer. The DASHTAK village looks very impressive with its staircase architecture.

Tourist areas 
According to the Public Relations Department of Cultural Heritage, Handicrafts and Tourism Organization of Fars, it is an old plane trees village, with one of the oldest trees in Iran and the world in general. The tree height is in the core of the village, according to some natural paleontologists, dating back four thousand years. Fakhruddin shrine, the shrine revered buildings in the village. One of the interesting works, Dashtak village, the staircase is named Cattell. 1,200 stairs and through it to the rest of the movement were in the past. The old mill village, consisting of six old mills that have been used in the past the old mill village Dashtak is a sign of cultural and historical monuments. Spas Khnar, Nhrvm, Morshedi, Bgry, ten times, the valley and the spa waters are healing. Natural attractions include  Willow Springs Water Chghvr, garden Jamal (Babajmal), three wells, the Bidi, narrow tail, Bidak, Abdv, Grdvk, Tdk, Baghak, Swivel and spring flowers Jshmh beautiful Saran is located in the mountains around the village are DASHTAK.

Customs 
Shoemaker weaving, rug and carpet weaving. Nine local game play and kicking game is common. Folk music Dashtak people also often played with reeds and local melodies as sung and played Shoshtari.

References 

Populated places in Marvdasht County